Yad Vashem: Preserving the Past to Ensure the Future is a 1989 American short documentary film produced by Ray Errol Fox about Yad Vashem. It was nominated for an Academy Award for Best Documentary Short.

See also
 Gathering the Fragments

References

External links
 
 Preserving the Past to Ensure the Future at Ergo Media

1989 films
1989 documentary films
1989 short films
1989 independent films
American short documentary films
American independent films
1980s short documentary films
Documentary films about the Holocaust
Yad Vashem
1980s English-language films
1980s American films